Bargy is a barony in County Wexford, Ireland. From the 12th century Bargy and the surrounding area, including the barony of Forth, saw extensive Anglo-Norman settlement following the Norman invasion of Ireland. A distinctive Anglic language, known as the Yola language or simply Yola, was spoken in this area into the 19th century.

References
Jacob Poole, T. P. Dolan, and Diarmaid Ó Muirithe, Dialect of Forth and Bargy, Co. Wexford, Ireland, 1867, repub. 1996.

History of County Wexford
Baronies of County Wexford